Viresh Dhaiber (details unknown) was an Indian cricketer who played for Baroda.

Dhaiber made a single first-class appearance for the team, in 1981-82, against Gujarat. From the middle of the order, he scored 14 not out in the only innings in which he batted.

Baroda won the match by an innings margin, as Gujarat were bowled out in their second innings for just 50 runs.

External links
V. Dhaiber at Cricket Archive 

Indian cricketers
Baroda cricketers
Living people
Year of birth missing (living people)